San Martín de Unx (Basque: San Martin Unx or Donamartiri-Untz)  is a town and municipality in the province and autonomous community of Navarre, northern Spain.

References

External links
 SAN MARTIN DE UNX in the Bernardo Estornés Lasa - Auñamendi Encyclopedia (Euskomedia Fundazioa) 

Municipalities in Navarre